Simone Joseph (born 11 April 1982 in Johannesburg, South Africa) is a South African former competitive figure skater. She is the 1999-2000 South African national silver medalist and competed in the free skate at two Four Continents Championships.

Programs

Results
JGP: ISU Junior Series / ISU Junior Grand Prix

References

External links
 

South African female single skaters
1982 births
Living people
Sportspeople from Johannesburg